Jorge Goeters (born June 26, 1970) is a Mexican racecar driver.

At the present time, Goeters competes full-time in the NASCAR Mexico Series in Mexico. In the past few years he also competed at the international level on a limited basis, running a handful of races in the NASCAR Nextel Cup Series, NASCAR Busch Series, NASCAR PEAK Mexico Series, Indy Lights, Champ Car World Series, A1 Grand Prix, and Rolex Sports Car Series. He is known for winning the pole position for the inaugural Busch Series race in Mexico City.

Early career

Goeters had an early start in motorsports, beginning in motocross at age 8. He won several championships in Mexico, as well as international events in this discipline, before making the move to auto racing in 1993.

In 1996, he won his first national championship, in the Prototypes category. The next year he won the Mexican Trans-Am series, and in 1998 he went to compete in the United States.

In 1998, he had a fairly successful debut season in the Indy Lights championship, in which he earned one Pole position, one track record, two top five, and two top ten finishes.

Back in his homeland, he competed in the Mexican Formula 2 Championship in 2001, and the MasterCard Truck Series Championship in 2002.

In 2004 he took part in the inaugural season of the Desafío Corona stock car series, and finished 4th in the championship.

Career in NASCAR and other international series

In 2004, he entered a NASCAR West Series event at Irwindale Event Center but failed to qualify. In his return to the West Series in 2005, now at Auto Club Speedway, Goeters made the race and finished 10th.

2005 was a very eventful year for Goeters, as he won the championship in the Desafío Corona series, and made his NASCAR and Grand-Am debut, as well as his lone start in the Champ Car World Series.

Goeters won a very popular pole position in his NASCAR Busch Series debut at Autódromo Hermanos Rodríguez in Mexico City, driving the No. 66 Canel's/Scotiabank Ford Taurus for Brewco Motorsports. He led 24 laps, but later had to retire from the race with an engine failure. He ran two more Busch Series races in 2005, driving the No. 32 Chevy for Braun Racing, with a best result of 9th at Watkins Glen International.

He contested a Champ Car race in Monterrey, Mexico for PKV Racing, but had to retire with mechanical problems on Lap 24.

He made his lone NASCAR Nextel Cup Series start at Watkins Glen, driving the No. 50 Dodge for Arnold Motorsports. He led some laps during the race, but eventually finished 35th as a result of small contact in the closing laps.

In 2005, he also competed in the Rolex Sports Car Series event at Watkins Glen.

After his success in the 2005 season, Goeters looked to continue his career in the United States, and in 2006 the announcement was made that he would drive for a new team in the Busch Series, Latin American Racing; however, the team never became a reality. Still, Goeters took part in a handful of races in the Busch Series. He returned to run the Mexico City race with Brewco, finishing 14th, and then joined Jay Robinson Racing to drive the No. 49 Ford. He finished 41st at Bristol and 24th at Nashville, but failed to qualify at Las Vegas, Atlanta, Texas, Phoenix and Richmond in the team's underpowered car. Goeters left the team, and then made another start in the season finale at Homestead, driving the No. 63 car for Spraker Racing Enterprises, but retired with mechanical problems.

Also in 2006, he made a start in ARCA Re/Max Series at Chicagoland Speedway driving No. 24 Ford for Bob Schacht Motorsports. Goeters started 19th and finished 7th after led 4 laps.

In 2007, Goeters competed in the NASCAR Busch Series as a road course ringer. He ran at Mexico City, Watkins Glen, and Montreal, with strong qualifying performances in the three races. However, his only good finish came at home as he finished 7th at Mexico City. He also competed in the Rolex Sports Car Series race at Mexico City, and in the opening event of the A1 Grand Prix series for Team Mexico. He also drove full-time in the NASCAR Corona Series, in which he won a race at Guadalajara and finished 6th in the championship.

In 2008, he returned to run full-time in Mexico, and finished 6th in the NASCAR Corona Series, driving the No. 4 car.

During the 97th lap of a 100-lap Corona Series race at Autódromo Miguel E. Abed in Amozoc, Puebla, on June 14, 2009, Goeters made contact with Carlos Pardo, which caused the latter to lose control of his car and impact against a barrier sideways at over 200 km/h causing the disintegration of the car and Pardo's death. As the race was over the time limit, the standings of the previous lap were taken into account and Pardo was posthumously declared winner.

In 2012 he was the champion of NASCAR Toyota Series.

Personal life
Goeters is part of a racing family that also includes his brothers Patrick and Eduardo, who have also competed successfully in several categories in Mexico, including the NASCAR Corona Series.

Motorsports career results

Career summary

(1) = Team standings.

Champ Car

NASCAR
(key) (Bold – Pole position awarded by qualifying time. Italics – Pole position earned by points standings or practice time. * – Most laps led.)

Nextel Cup Series

Busch Series

West Series

References

External links 
 

Living people
1970 births
Racing drivers from Mexico City
Mexican racing drivers
Mexican people of German descent
NASCAR drivers
ARCA Menards Series drivers
Champ Car drivers
Indy Lights drivers
Latin America Formula Renault 2000 drivers
A1 Team Mexico drivers
A1 Grand Prix drivers
KV Racing Technology drivers